Smilewound is the sixth studio album by Icelandic electronic band múm, which released on 6 September 2013 on CD, vinyl and digital download. On 7 September, it was released on cassette for Cassette Store Day.

The first single, "Toothwheels", was released in May, 2013. A video for it was released in June, directed by múm, Árni Rúnar Hlöðversson and Bruno Granato.

Track listing 
"Toothwheels"
"Underwater Snow"
"When Girls Collide"
"Slow Down"
"Candlestick"
"One Smile"
"Eternity is the Wait Between Breaths"
"The Colorful Stabwound"
"Sweet Impressions"
"Time to Scream and Shout"

Bonus track
"Whistle" (with Kylie Minogue)

Release history

References 

Múm albums
2013 albums